182nd Brigade may refer to:

 182nd Mixed Brigade (Spain)
 182nd (2nd Warwickshire) Brigade (United Kingdom)